Willehad or Willihad;  745 AD  8 November 789) was a Christian missionary and possibly the Bishop of Bremen from 787 AD.

Willehad was born in Northumbria and probably received his education at York under Ecgbert. He was ordained after his education, and about the year 766, he went to Frisia, preaching at Dokkum and in Overijssel, to continue the missionary work of Boniface who had been martyred by the Frisians in 754. At an assembly in Paderborn in 777, Saxony was divided into missionary zones. The zone between the Weser and the Elbe, called Wigmodia, was given to Willehad.

From 780 Willehad preached in the region of the lower Weser River on commission from Charlemagne.  He barely escaped with his life when the Frisians wanted to kill him as well and he returned to the area around Utrecht.  Once again he and his fellow missionaries barely escaped with their lives when the local pagans wanted to kill them for destroying some temples. Finally, in 780, Charlemagne sent him to evangelize the Saxons.  He preached to them for two years but, in 782, the Saxons under Widukind, rebelled against Charlemagne and Willehad was forced to flee to Frisia.  He took the opportunity to travel to Rome where he reported to Pope Adrian I on his work.

Upon his return from Rome, Willehad retired for a time to the monastery of Echternach, in present-day Luxembourg.  He spent two years there reassembling his missionary team.

After Charlemagne's conquest of the Saxons, Willehad preached in the region around the lower Elbe and the lower Weser. In 787 Willehad was consecrated bishop, and that part of Saxony and Friesland near the mouth of the Weser was assigned to him for his diocese. He chose as his see the city of Bremen, which is mentioned for the first time in documents of 782, and built a cathedral there. Praised for its beauty by Anschar, it was dedicated in 789.

Willehad died in Blexen upon Weser, today a part of Nordenham. He is buried in the city's cathedral, which he consecrated shortly before his death on 8 November 789. Anschar compiled a life of Willehad, and the preface which he wrote was considered a masterpiece for that age. In 860, a sick girl from Wege (Weyhe) travelled to his grave. There, she was reportedly cured by a miracle. This was the first time the small village was mentioned in any historical documents.

See also
 Saint Willehad, patron saint archive

References

Sources

External links

Saint of the Day, November 8: Willehad of Bremen at SaintPatrickDC.org
Willehad at Patron Saints Index
Bishopric of Bremen

789 deaths
Northumbrian saints
Christian missionaries in Germany
Bishops of Bremen
8th-century Christian saints
Medieval German saints
740s births
8th-century Frankish bishops